Artav (’rt’w “the just”, also spelled Artabanus) was a Khwarazmian king who ruled the Khwarazm region of Central Asia in the second half of the 2nd-century. He was the second king of an unnamed kingdom in Khwarazm, founded by his predecessor, whose name is unknown. Artav, during his reign, started the construction of the city of Toprak-Kala, which became his capital.

Some of his coins were found in his capital city of Toprak-Kala, together with coins of the Kushan Empire rulers Vima Kadphises and Kanishka.

References

Sources 
 
 

Year of death unknown
1st-century births
1st-century Iranian people